Arthur Lloyd Windsor ( – 20 January 1913) was an Australian journalist noted for his work on The Argus and The Age.

Biography
Windsor came from a Canadian family, owners of a sugar plantation in the West Indies. He was born at sea on a voyage to Barbados, the son of Henry George Windsor and his wife, Clara Windsor. He was baptised in November 1832 in Saint Michael, Barbados. His father was a slaveholder; he received £318 in compensation for 14 slaves he owned in Barbados, after the passage of the Slavery Abolition Act 1833. Windsor's father died when he was five years old, and when he was about eight he was sent to school at Ottery, St Mary, Devonshire. He left school at 17, lived at Clifton and did some writing for the London press. He then returned to Barbados and for about 18 months taught at Codrington College. About the end of 1855 he went to Montreal and later to Glasgow. He worked as an army coach and also contributed to leading reviews; he had articles on Defoe and on Montaigne in the British Quarterly Review, in 1858. A collection of his articles was published in 1860, Ethica: or Characteristics of Men, Manners and Books.

He was appointed editor of the Melbourne Argus not long afterwards, but resigned on a question of policy after holding the position for two and a half years. Windsor subsequently went to live at Castlemaine and edited the Mount Alexander Mail for three years. In 1872 he succeeded James Harrison as editor of The Age and continued in this position for 28 years. It was a period of great importance for Victoria which saw the transition from a colony depending principally on the pastoral industry and gold-mining, to one in which agriculture and manufacturing were to be even more important. David Syme, as proprietor of the Age, directed its policy, and there were periods when he practically ruled Victoria. Windsor's vigorous and gifted mind was the medium through which Syme's ideas were brought before the public. The literary power of his leaders and other contributions was strongly felt by their readers, and Windsor's influence on the period marked him as one of the great journalists of his time. He retired in 1900 and lived in Melbourne until his death.

References

External links
 

1832 births
1913 deaths
People born at sea
Australian journalists
Australian people of Canadian descent